The Nicholls Colonels softball team represents Nicholls State University in NCAA Division I college softball. The team participates in the Southland Conference. Nicholls' first softball team was fielded in 1981. The team plays its home games at 500-seat Swanner Field at Geo Surfaces Park and are coached by Angel Santiago.

History
The Colonels's inaugural season was in 1981. The Colonels have won five Southland Conference regular season titles (1992, 1994, 1995, 1996, 2018) and two Southland Conference Tournament titles (1996 and 1997), the Colonels have appeared in the NCAA Division I softball tournament three times (1995, 1996, 1997) with a tournament record of 3–6.

Year-by-year results
Source:

Postseason appearances

NCAA Division I Tournament results
The Colonels have appeared in three NCAA Division I Tournaments, all as Nicholls State University. Their combined record is 3–6.

Source:

NCAA Division I Tournament play-in results
The Colonels have appeared in three NCAA Division I Tournament Play-Ins, all as Nicholls State University. Their combined record is 6–0.

Source:

NWIT Division I Tournament results
The 1987 team appeared in the women's NWIT tournament winning one of three games.

Source:

See also
 List of NCAA Division I softball programs

References

External links
 
 Nicholls Colonels Athletic facilities

 
Sports clubs established in 1981
1981 establishments in Louisiana